Rick Smith may refer to:

Sports
Rick Smith (American football, born 1948), American football coach
Ricky Smith (American football) (born 1960), former American football cornerback 
Rick Smith (American football executive), former General Manager of the Houston Texans of the NFL
Rick Smith (ice hockey) (born 1948), ice hockey player

Other
Rick Smith Jr. (born 1981), magician
Rick Smith (environmentalist) (born 1968), Canadian environmentalist
Rick Smith (author) (born 1967), American entrepreneur and business writer
Rick Smith (musician) (born 1959), member of the band Underworld
Ricky Smith, actor best known for his role in the PBS Kids Go series, The Electric Company
Rick Smith, CEO of Axon (formerly known as TASER International)
Rick Smith, also known as Richard F. Smith, former chairman and CEO of Equifax

See also
Richard Smith (disambiguation)
Dick Smith (disambiguation)